Stuart Meha (29 December 1878 – 7 November 1963) was a New Zealand  farmer and local Mormon leader. Of Māori descent, he identified with the Ngati Kahungunu, Ngati Rakaipaaka and Rangitane iwi. He was born in Wanstead, Hawke's Bay, New Zealand on 29 December 1878.

Meha was baptised as a member of the Church of Jesus Christ of Latter-day Saints (LDS Church) when he was eight years old; his parents were converts to the church. In 1916, he served as a missionary to other Māori villages. Between 1917 and 1919, he assisted Matthew Cowley in the re-translation of the Book of Mormon into Māori and with the first-time translations of the Doctrine and Covenants and the Pearl of Great Price into Māori. In 1928, Meha became the first counsellor to Eriata Nopera, who was the first Māori to be the president of an LDS Church district. After Nopera's tenure, Meha became the president of the church's Hawke's Bay District.

References

1878 births
1963 deaths
New Zealand farmers
New Zealand leaders of the Church of Jesus Christ of Latter-day Saints
Ngāti Kahungunu people
Ngati Rakaipaaka people
Rangitāne people
New Zealand Māori religious leaders
Translators from English
Translators to Māori
People from the Hawke's Bay Region
New Zealand Mormon missionaries
Mormon missionaries in New Zealand
20th-century Mormon missionaries
Translators of the Book of Mormon
20th-century translators
Missionary linguists